Václav Kalina (born 15 July 1979) is a Czech football player who played as a midfielder for Bohemians 1905 and FK Mladá Boleslav in the Czech First League. He currently plays for SK Kladno in lower Czech tiers.

References
 Profile at iDNES.cz
 Guardian Football

Czech footballers
Czech First League players
SK Kladno players
FK Mladá Boleslav players
1979 births
Living people
Sportspeople from Kladno
Association football fullbacks